The Queens of France and Famous Women (Reines de France et Femmes illustres) is a group of sculptures in the Jardin du Luxembourg in Paris. It consists of 20 marble sculptures arranged around a large pond in front of the Palais du Luxembourg. Louis-Philippe I chose the women to be portrayed and most of the sculptures were commissioned around 1843, for around 12,000 francs each, and generally exhibited in the Paris Salons of 1847 or 1848. 

The series originally included an 1852 statue of Joan of Arc by François Rude, which was moved to the Louvre in 1872 because it was considered too fragile to remain outdoors. The French government commissioned a substitute of Margaret of Anjou for 7,000 francs from Taluet, who completed it in 1877. It was exhibited at the 1895 Salon.

Clockwise starting at the northeast, the figures are:

References

Monuments and memorials in Paris
July Monarchy
Buildings and structures in the 6th arrondissement of Paris
Sculpture series